Ronald Clarke may refer to:
Ron Clarke (speedway rider) (1914–1981), former motorcycle speedway world finalist
Ron Clarke (1937–2015), Australian athlete and mayor of the Gold Coast, Queensland
Ronald J. Clarke, paleoanthropologist most notable for the discovery of Little Foot
Ronald V. Clarke, advocate of rational choice theory in criminology

See also
Ronald Clark (disambiguation)